Lillfårögrynnan is a Swedish island belonging to the Kalix archipelago. The island is a part of Fåröholmarna together with Lillfåröholmen and Flaragrynnorna. Lillfårögrynnan means shallowness to Lill-Fårön, but over time it has become an island. The island is located south of Lill-Fårön and has no shore connection.

References 

Islands of Norrbotten County
Swedish islands in the Baltic